Reduction of order is a technique in mathematics for solving second-order linear ordinary differential equations. It is employed when one solution  is known and a second linearly independent solution  is desired. The method also applies to n-th order equations.

Second-order linear ordinary differential equations

An example

Consider the general, homogeneous, second-order linear constant coefficient ordinary differential equation. (ODE)

where  are real non-zero coefficients. Two linearly independent solutions for this ODE can be straightforwardly found using characteristic equations except for the case when the discriminant, vanishes. In this case,

from which only one solution,

can be found using its characteristic equation.

The method of reduction of order is used to obtain a second linearly independent solution to this differential equation using our one known solution. To find a second solution we take as a guess

where  is an unknown function to be determined. Since  must satisfy the original ODE, we substitute it back in to get

Rearranging this equation in terms of the derivatives of  we get

Since we know that  is a solution to the original problem, the coefficient of the last term is equal to zero. Furthermore, substituting  into the second term's coefficient yields (for that coefficient)

Therefore, we are left with

This can be integrated twice to yield

where  are constants of integration. We now can write our second solution as

Finally, we can prove that the second solution  found via this method is linearly independent of the first solution by calculating the Wronskian

Thus  is the second linearly independent solution we were looking for.

General method

Given the general non-homogeneous linear differential equation

and a single solution  of the homogeneous equation [], let us try a solution of the full non-homogeneous equation in the form:

where  is an arbitrary function.  Thus

and

Since  is a solution of the original homogeneous differential equation, so we can reduce to

Multiplying the differential equation by the integrating factor , the equation for  can be reduced to

After integrating the last equation,  is found, containing one constant of integration. Then, integrate  to find the full solution of the original non-homogeneous second-order equation, exhibiting two constants of integration as it should:

See also

 Variation of parameters

References
 W. E. Boyce and R. C. DiPrima, Elementary Differential Equations and Boundary Value Problems (8th edition), John Wiley & Sons, Inc., 2005. .
 
 Eric W. Weisstein, Second-Order Ordinary Differential Equation Second Solution, From MathWorld—A Wolfram Web Resource.

Ordinary differential equations